Giacomo Lauri (1623–1694) was an Italian engraver of the Baroque period, active mainly in his native Rome.

He published, in 1612, a set of 166 prints, entitled Antiquae Urbis Splendor, consisting of views of the ancient buildings of Rome.

Sources

Italian engravers
Italian Baroque painters
1694 deaths
1623 births